Detonator is a Space Shot ride at Worlds of Fun in Kansas City, Missouri. It made history as the first Space Shot ride in the United States, as well as the first in the world to have a twin-tower form. Detonator launches riders 210 feet in the air only to fall right back down.

External links
Official page

Amusement rides manufactured by S&S – Sansei Technologies
Worlds of Fun
Amusement rides introduced in 1996
Cedar Fair attractions
1996 establishments in Missouri
Drop tower rides